Scathophaga inquinata is a species of fly in the family Scathophagidae. It is found in the  Palearctic. It has a pale, orangey brown abdomen, orange legs, and plumose arista and is often found on pond edges or in wet meadows.

References

Scathophagidae
Insects described in 1826
Muscomorph flies of Europe